Arthur "Art" L. Money is an American engineer, businessman and government official who served as the Assistant Secretary of Defense for Command, Control, Communications and Intelligence (ASD C3I) from 7 October 1999 to 7 April 2001. He concurrently served as the Department of Defense's Chief Information Officer (CIO) from February 1998 to April 2001.

Art Money also served as the Assistant Secretary of the Air Force for Research and as the CIO of the Air Force from January 1996 to February 1998.

Before his government service, Money was the president of ESL Inc., a subsidiary of TRW Inc. from January 1990 to December 1994. On ESL's consolidation into TRW's Avionics and Surveillance Group in 1995, he became Vice President and Deputy General Manager for TRW Avionics and Surveillance Group, until January 1996.

Education
Art Money obtained a Bachelor of Science degree in mechanical engineering from San Jose State University in 1965 and a Masters of Science in mechanical engineering from the University of Santa Clara in 1970. In 1985, he attended Harvard University's Executive Security Program; and in 1988 attended the Massachusetts Institute of Technology's (MIT) Program for Senior Executives.

Career

Aerospace industry
Money worked as an engineer at the Lockheed Missiles and Space Company in Sunnyvale, California from February 1962 to February 1972.

He then joined ESL Inc. and worked as an engineer, manager and director of various units until 1978. In January 1980, he was appointed as Vice President at ESL Inc., and served until December 1989. In January 1990, he was appointed as the president of ESL Inc. On ESL's consolidation into TRW's Avionics and Surveillance Group in 1995, he became Vice President and Deputy General Manager for TRW Avionics and Surveillance Group, until January 1996.

US government
Art Money was appointed as the Assistant Secretary of the Air Force for Research, Development and Acquisition in January 1996, after being confirmed to the role by the United States Senate. He served in this role until February 1998, when he was appointed as a 'Senior Civilian Official' to the Office of the Assistant Secretary of Defense for Command, Control, Communications and Intelligence (OASD C3I).

In October 1999, he was appointed as the Assistant Secretary of Defense for Command, Control, Communications and Intelligence (ASD C3I) after confirmation by the United States Senate. He would serve in this role until retirement in April 2001.

After government
Since leaving the government, Money has been a member of various US governmental advisory boards, including the NSA Advisory Board, the Chairman of the FBI Director’s Advisory Board, and on the Defense Science Board; panels and commissions; and served as a member of the board of directors of several US public companies.

Awards and honors
 National Academy of Engineering, Member, 2013, for "engineering developments and technical leadership in support of U.S. national security efforts."
 Intelligence and National Security Alliance William Oliver Baker Award, 2012 
 National Geospatial-Intelligence Agency (NGA) Medallion of Excellence, June 2006 
 Intelligence Community Seal Medallion, April 2001 
 Defense Intelligence Agency Director's Award, March 2001 
 National Imagery and Mapping Agency Medallion for Excellence, March 2001 
 Department of Defense Distinguished Public Service Award (Bronze Palm), January 2001 
 Department of the Navy Distinguished Public Service Award, January 2001 
 National Reconnaissance Office Distinguished Public Service Award, January 2001 
 Association of Old Crows Executive Management Award, 1999 
 Air Force Association Theodore von Kármán Award for Science and Engineering, 1998 
 Department of the Air Force Distinguished Civilian Service Award, October 1997 
 San Jose State University, Distinguished Engineering Award, 1995

References

Living people
San Jose State University alumni
Santa Clara University alumni
American aerospace engineers
United States Assistant Secretaries of Defense
United States Department of Defense officials
United States Air Force civilians
Clinton administration personnel
George W. Bush administration personnel
Year of birth missing (living people)